Polysarcus is a genus of bush crickets in the subfamily Phaneropterinae and tribe Barbitistini.  Species can be found in western Europe (but not the British Isles or Scandinavia), Middle East through to Afghanistan.

Species
The Orthoptera Species File lists:
 Polysarcus denticauda (Charpentier, 1825) - type species
 Polysarcus elbursianus (Uvarov, 1930)
 Polysarcus scutatus (Brunner von Wattenwyl, 1882)
 Polysarcus zacharovi (Stshelkanovtzev, 1910)
 Polysarcus zigana Ünal & Chobanov, 2013

References

External Links
 
 

Tettigoniidae genera
Phaneropterinae
Orthoptera of Europe